Napa County is a county north of San Pablo Bay located in the northern portion of the U.S. state of California. As of the 2020 census, the population was 138,019. The county seat is the City of Napa. Napa County was one of the original counties of California, created in 1850 at the time of statehood. Parts of the county's territory were given to Lake County in 1861.

Napa County comprises the Napa, CA Metropolitan Statistical Area, which is also included in the San Jose-San Francisco-Oakland, CA Combined Statistical Area. It is one of four North Bay counties.

Napa County, once the producer of many different crops, is known today for its regional wine industry, rising to the first rank of wine regions with France by local wineries Stag's Leap Wine Cellars and Chateau Montelena winning the "Judgment of Paris" in 1976.

History

Prehistory–18th century
In prehistoric times, the valley was inhabited by the Patwin Native Americans, with possible habitation by Wappo tribes in the northwestern foothills. Most villages are thought to have been constructed near the floodplains of watercourses that drain the valley. Their food consisted of wild roots, acorns, small animals, earthworms, grasshoppers, and bread made from crushed California buckeye kernels. In winter they would construct huts made of tree branches. In summer they camped near rivers and streams. In winter months, they were half-clad in wild animal skins and at other times they wore no clothing. The maximum prehistoric population is thought not to have exceeded 5000 persons.

In 1776, a fort was erected by the Spanish Governor, Felipe de Neve a short distance northwest of Napa, on an elevated plateau. Russians from Sonoma County's Fort Ross grazed cattle and sheep in the Napa Valley in the early 19th century and in 1841 a survey party from the fort placed a plaque on the summit of Mount Saint Helena.

Early 19th century
Francis Castro and Father Jose Altimura were the first Europeans to explore the Napa Valley, in 1823. When the first white settlers arrived in the early 1830s, there were six tribes in the valley speaking different dialects and they were often at war with each other. The Mayacomos tribe lived in the area where Calistoga was founded. The Callajomans were in the area near where the town of St. Helena now stands. Further south, the Kymus dwelt in the middle part of the valley. The Napa and Ulcus tribes occupied part of the area where the City of Napa now exists while the Soscol tribe occupied the portion that now makes up the southern end of the valley. Many of the native peoples died during a smallpox epidemic in 1838. Settlers also killed several over claims of cattle theft.

During the era between 1836 and 1846, when California was a province of independent Mexico, the following 13 ranchos were granted in Napa County:

Carne Humana
Catacula
Caymus
Chimiles
Entre Napa
La Jota
Las Putas
Locoallomi
Napa
Tulucay
Yajome
Huichica
Mallacomes

George C. Yount was an early settler in Napa County and is believed to be the first Anglo-Saxon resident in the county. In 1836 Yount obtained the Mexican grant Rancho Caymus where he built what is said to be the first log house in California. Soon afterward, he built a sawmill and grain mill, and was the first person to plant a vineyard in the county. Following Yount's death in 1865 at age 71, the town of Yountville was named in his honor.

Following his marriage to General Vallejo’s niece Maria Guadalupe Soberanes, Edward Turner Bale became a citizen of Mexico and was granted Rancho Carne Humana in the northern end of the valley. Bale completed building the Bale Grist Mill a few miles north of St. Helena in 1846. Colonel Joseph B. Chiles a guide for one of the earliest immigrant trains to California, was granted Rancho Catacula in 1844.

The Town of Napa was founded on Rancho Entre Napa by Nathan Coombs in 1847.

Following the event of the Mexican–American War, Bear Flag Revolt in 1846 and the Mexican Cession in 1848, settlers were granted deeds from the original ranchos during the 1850s through 1870s. To this day, a number of streets and landmarks around the valley reflect the names of these ranchos and original grantees.

Late 19th century
Napa County was formed and became one of the original California counties when the state became part of the United States in 1850.

Descendants of George Yount and Captain Edward Bale played key roles in the early development of Napa County. Yount's granddaughter Elizabeth Yount married Thomas Rutherford in 1864. The couple received as a wedding gift from George Yount, land in the area of the valley now known as Rutherford. Rutherford established himself as a serious grower and producer of fine wines in the following years. Bale's oldest daughter Lolita married the seaman Louis Bruck. When Bale died in 1848, Bruck became the executor of the will for the family. He was elected the first mayor of Napa City when incorporated in 1872. Charles Krug, a fellow Prussian compatriot and pioneer viticulturalist at Sonoma, married Lolita's younger sister Caroline with a dowry that included land near the Bale mill. Krug then moved north of St. Helena to establish the valley's first commercial winery.

John Patchett opened the first commercial winery in the county in 1859. The vineyard and wine cellar were in an area now in the city limits of Napa. After working as a winemaker for Patchett, Charles Krug founded his own winery in St. Helena 1861.

The county's population began to grow in the mid-century as pioneers, prospectors, and entrepreneurs moved in and set up residence. During this period, settlers primarily raised cattle and farmed grain and fruit crops. Mineral mining also played a role in the economics of the county. In 1858 the great silver rush began in Napa Valley, and miners flocked to the eastern hills. While gold was being prospected in other areas of the state in the 1850s, Napa County became a center for silver and quicksilver mining. In the 1860s, mining carried on, on a large scale, with quicksilver mines operating in many areas of Napa County.

In 1866 John Lawley established a toll road from Calistoga over Mount Saint Helena to Lake County.

Robert Louis Stevenson's book The Silverado Squatters provides a snapshot of life and insight into some of the characters that lived around the valley during the later part of the 19th century. Stevenson, accompanied by his new bride Fanny Vandegrift and her 12-year-old son from a previous marriage, Lloyd Osbourne, spent the late spring and early summer of 1880 honeymooning in an abandoned bunk house at a played-out mine near the summit of Mount Saint Helena. In the book, Stevenson's descriptive writing style documented his ventures in the area and profiled several of the early pioneers who played a role in shaping the region's commerce and society. Stevenson's book also brought attention to the various spas and hot springs in the county.  From Calistoga to Æetna Springs in Pope Valley to Soda Springs Resort a few miles east of Napa, tourists of the late 19th and early 20th centuries made the county their destination much the same as modern day tourists. The resorts became very popular with San Franciscans anxious to escape the cold and foggy weather that often plagues the city to enjoy the warmer climate Napa County offered.

In the mid-1880s, entrepreneur Samuel Brannan purchased land in the northern end of the valley at the foot of Mount Saint Helena and founded Calistoga. He began developing it as a resort town taking advantage of or the area's numerous mineral hot springs. He also founded the Napa Valley Railroad Company in 1864 to bring tourists to Calistoga from San Francisco ferry boats that docked in Vallejo. Brannan's railroad venture failed and was sold at a foreclosure sale in 1869. The railroad eventually came under the ownership of Southern Pacific Railroad late in the 19th century.

The Veterans Home of California Yountville was established in Yountville in 1884 by the San Francisco chapter of the Grand Army of the Republic. The State of California assumed administration of the Home in 1897.

20th and 21st centuries

By the end of the 1900s, farmers had planted over 500,000 fruit and nut trees in the county, especially plums and pears. This helped to soften the blows to the agricultural economy caused by the phylloxera infestation in the county's vineyards and upcoming prohibition that crippled the wine industry, but resulted in a boom for shipping grapes to immigrant, home winemakers across the country.

During World War II, the Basalt Rock Company located south of the City of Napa on the Napa River, built 3 dozen salvage rescue tugs for the United States Navy. German prisoners of war were housed in a Camp Beale satellite prisoner of war camp near Yountville.  The prisoners were utilized to supplement a dwindled able bodied agricultural labor force caused by the needs of the American war effort.

Following the war, several new small and medium size businesses began operating in the County. A large majority of these businesses were related to the wine industry and tourism. Agriculture in the county remained very diverse until late in the 20th century when wine grapes again became the primary focus. While vineyards were planted on well over 90% of the agricultural land in the county, by the end of the 20th century, modern day farmers have recently begun exploring the possibility of raising other food crops in order to again diversify and take advantage of growing conditions.

In October 2017, parts of the county were affected by wildfires.

From June to July 2018, the County Fire affected a small part of Napa County after crossing over from Yolo County, California.

In October 2019, heavy smoke and unscheduled black outs by Pacific Gas and Electric Company of up to 20,000 customers affected the county due to fierce winds and threats from the Kincade Fire.

Geography

Napa is warmer in the summer than Sonoma County, to the west, or Santa Barbara County, a wine-producing county in southern California. Thus, the Napa wineries favor varietals such as Cabernet Sauvignon, while Pinot noir and Chardonnay are more the specialty of Sonoma and Santa Barbara wineries. At the north end of Napa County, in the Mayacamas Mountains, lies Mount Saint Helena, the Bay Area's second tallest peak at 4,344 feet (1,323 m) and home to Robert Louis Stevenson State Park; Snell Valley is also situated in northern Napa County; the Missimer Wildflower Preserve is within Snell Valley. On the west side of the Napa Valley is Hood Mountain, elevation 2,750 feet (838 m).

Napa County is home to a variety of flora and fauna including numerous rare and endangered species such as Tiburon Indian paintbrush and Contra Costa goldfields.

Adjacent counties
 Lake County - northwest
 Yolo County - northeast
 Solano County - east
 Sonoma County - west

National protected area
 San Pablo Bay National Wildlife Refuge (part)

Rivers and creeks
 Napa River
 Milliken Creek
 Putah Creek

Lakes, marshes and reservoirs

 East Napa Reservoir
 East Side Reservoir
 Fiege Reservoir
 Lake Berryessa
 Lake Hennessey
 Lake Marie
 Lake Orville
 Lake Whitehead
 Milliken Reservoir
 Napa Sonoma Marsh
 Rector Reservoir
 West Napa Reservoir

Demographics

2020 census

Note: the US Census treats Hispanic/Latino as an ethnic category. This table excludes Latinos from the racial categories and assigns them to a separate category. Hispanics/Latinos can be of any race.

2011

Places by population, race, and income

2010
The 2010 United States Census reported Napa County had a population of 136,484. The racial makeup of Napa County was 97,525 (71.5%) White, 2,668 (2.0%) African American, 1,058 (0.8%) Native American, 9,223 (6.8%) Asian, 372 (0.3%) Pacific Islander, 20,058 (14.7%) from other races, and 5,580 (4.1%) from two or more races. Hispanic or Latino of any race were 44,010 persons (32.2%).

2000
As of the census of 2000, there were 124,279 people, 45,402 households, and 30,691 families residing in the county. There were 48,554 housing units at an average density of 64 per square mile (25/km2). The racial makeup of the county in 2010 was 56.4% non-Hispanic White, 1.8% non-Hispanic Black or African American, 0.4% Native American, 6.6% Asian, 0.2% Pacific Islander, 0.2% from other races, and 2.2% from two or more races. 32.2% of the population were Hispanic or Latino of any race. 11.9% were of German, 9.7% English, 8.6% Irish, 6.7% Italian and 5.3% American ancestry according to Census 2000. 75.3% spoke English, 19.5% Spanish and 1.1% Tagalog as their first language.

There were 45,402 households, out of which 31.4% had children under the age of 18 living with them, 53.2% were married couples living together, 9.9% had a female householder with no husband present, and 32.4% were non-families. 25.8% of all households were made up of individuals, and 11.6% had someone living alone who was 65 years of age or older. The average household size was 2.62 and the average family size was 3.16.

In the county, the population was spread out, with 24.1% under the age of 18, 8.5% from 18 to 24, 27.7% from 25 to 44, 24.3% from 45 to 64, and 15.4% who were 65 years of age or older.  The median age was 38 years. For every 100 females, there were 99.6 males. For every 100 females age 18 and over, there were 97.4 males.

Government 

Napa County is governed by a five-member Board of Supervisors. The supervisors are:
 District 1: Joelle Gallagher,
 District 2: Ryan Gregory,
 District 3: Anne Cottrell,
 District 4: Alfredo Pedroza, and
 District 5: Belia Ramos

The county is one of three counties in California to establish a separate department to deal with corrections pursuant to California Government Code §23013, along with Santa Clara County and Madera County.

Politics 
Historically, Napa County was heavily Republican.  It only supported a Democrat for president seven times – four of which were for Franklin D. Roosevelt – in the thirty-two presidential elections between 1860 and 1988. However, a Republican hasn't carried the county since George H. W. Bush in 1988. It is now one of the most Democratic counties in California, and is reckoned as part of the solid bloc of blue counties in the northern part of the state.

On November 4, 2008, Napa County voted 56 percent against Proposition 8, which amended the California Constitution to ban same-sex marriages.

According to the California Secretary of State, as of February 10, 2017, Napa County has 76,038 registered voters, out of 93,926 eligible (81.0%). Of those, 35,660 (46.9%) are registered Democrats, 18,417 (24.2%) are registered Republicans, and 17,827 (23.4%) have declined to state a political party.

Voter registration

Cities by population and voter registration

Crime 
The following table includes the number of incidents reported and the rate per 1,000 persons for each type of offense.

Cities by population and crime rates

Economy
Major Economic Activity in Napa County (Highest number in each category highlighted)

Wine

Napa Valley is widely considered one of the top American Viticultural Areas in California, and all of the United States, with a history dating back to the early nineteenth century. By the end of the nineteenth century, there were more than 140 wineries in the area. Several still exist in the valley including Charles Krug Winery, Schramsberg, Chateau Montelena, Nichelini and Beringer. Viticulture in Napa suffered a setback when prohibition was enacted in 1920.  Furthering the damage was an infestation of the phylloxera root louse which killed many of the vines through the valley. These two events caused many wineries to shut down and stalled the growth of the wine industry in Napa County for years. But for many Italian and Swiss families as farm labor in the vineyards, Prohibition offered the unique opportunity for the growing and shipping of grapes to immigrant homewinemakers across the country. Charles Forni, who received a gold coin as his first U.S. dollar upon arriving, rose to be a large shipper. The Mondavi family came West from the Minnesota ore-country to Lodi to ship grapes to the "Italian Club" miners. When Prohibition stopped in 1933, the price of grapes crashed to below $24 per ton. Then A.P. Giannini, founder of Bank of America at San Francisco, started to promote to rebuild the commerce of wine and viticulture. Following the Second World War, the wine industry in Napa again began to grow. But cattle and prunes were king.

In 1965, Napa Valley icon Robert Mondavi broke away from his family's Charles Krug estate to found his own. This was the first new large scale winery to be established in the valley since before prohibition. After the establishment of the Mondavi estate, the number of wineries in the valley continued to grow, as did the region's reputation. Consumer trends followed the 60s free lifestyle for experimentation. The old "paesano" customers of "dego red" gallon jug wines changed to young women who considered white wine, not beer, as their new drink of choice for romance. Robert Mondavi Winery attracted new wine aficionados by introducing the larger, 1.5-liter wine bottle for an image of affordable quality.

In addition to large scale wineries, Napa Valley's boutique wineries produce some of the world's best wines. The producers of these wines include but are not limited to: Araujo, Bryant Family, Monticello Vineyards, Ceja Vineyards, Chimney Rock Winery, Colgin Cellars, Dalla Valle Maya, Diamond Creek, Dominus Estate, Duckhorn Vineyards, Dunn Howell Mountain, Grace Family Vineyards, Harlan Estate, Husic, Kistler, Jericho Canyon Vineyards, Marcassin, Rutherford Hill Winery, Screaming Eagle, Sequoia Grove, Shafer Hillside Select, Steltzner Vineyards, and Bouchaine Vineyards.

Today Napa Valley features more than four hundred wineries and grows many different grape varieties including Cabernet Sauvignon, Chardonnay, Merlot, Zinfandel, and other popular varietals. As many as five million people visit the area each year.

Agricultural preservation

Napa County has maintained a rural agricultural environment in a large part of the valley floor while neighboring Sonoma, Solano, and Yolo counties have allowed large tracts of former farmland to be rezoned for commercial and residential development. In 1968 vintners and civic leaders in the county seized an opportunity to preserve farmland by taking advantage of the Williamson Act enacted by the California Legislature to give landowners property tax relief for designating their land for agricultural purposes. This agricultural preserve on the floor of the valley in unincorporated areas between Napa and Calistoga was the first of its kind in the state. In 2010, legislation was passed by the California State Senate and State Assembly and sent to the Governor for signing in the form of Senate Bill 1142. This bill was created to provide relief stream of funding to augment the Williamson Act.

The county has resisted encroachment on the preserve since it was created with voters reaffirming their desire to keep it intact on several occasions. In 1990 voters passed Measure J  adopting an initiative freezing all county zoning changes until the year 2020 unless there is a ⅔ majority vote to adopt such changes.  Measure J was reaffirmed by a 5–2 vote of the California Supreme Court in 1995 in the case of Devita v. County of Napa.

The Land Trust of Napa County was founded in 1976 by a group of local citizens with a mission to protect the natural diversity, scenic open space and agricultural vitality of the county. The trust acquires conservation easements, facilitates land transfers to local, state and federal agencies along with accepting outright donations of land within and outside the boundary of the agricultural preserve.

While establishment of the agricultural preserve and the land trust has slowed residential development in much of the county, residential growth within the incorporated cities has continued at a moderate pace. Several substantial homes have been built on the hills surrounding the valley in areas not covered by the preserve or the land trust. A large portion of the land south of the City of Napa remained undeveloped for many decades until the 1980s. Several wine bottling facilities and wine storage warehouses now stand on what was once vacant land. A number of light industries have also sprung up in this region as new business parks have been built. The growth of American Canyon, Napa County's southernmost and newest city, incorporated in 1992, has prompted the establishment of several new retail outlets in the southern end of the county in recent years.

In November 2009, the Napa Valley Vintners Association, the Napa Farm Bureau, the Napa Valley Grapegrowers and an advocacy group called Preserving the Integrity of Napa's Agriculture completed a two-year study of Genetically Engineered Organisms (GEOs), and released a joint letter recommending no GEO usage in Napa County until the risks and benefits of GEOs are reevaluated and a "satisfactory" regulatory framework is put in place.

Education
In addition to its many public and private schools, two colleges also operate in the County. Pacific Union College, classified as a National Liberal Arts College by the Carnegie Foundation, is the county's only four-year college and serves roughly 1,500 students. Napa Valley College, a community college, offers two-year degrees in the county.

K-12 schools 
K-12 school districts include:

Unified:
 Calistoga Joint Unified School District
 Fairfield-Suisun Unified School District
 Napa Valley Unified School District
 St. Helena Unified School District

Elementary:
 Howell Mountain Elementary School District
 Pope Valley Union Elementary School District

Library 
The Napa County Library, is the public library of Napa California. The main branch is in downtown Napa. There are three branch libraries, in American Canyon, Calistoga and Yountville.

Napa County Library is a member of LINK+, a union catalog of contributed holdings from participating libraries in California and Nevada.

Media
Napa County receives media from the rest of the Bay Area.

The county also has several media outlets that serve the local community:
Napa Valley Register
St. Helena Star
Weekly Calistogan
American Canyon Eagle
Calistoga Tribune
Yountville Sun
Napa Valley Life
KVON 1440 kHz AM
K245DK translating KVON 96.9 MHz in early 2019
KVYN 99.3 MHz FM
K278AH 103.5 MHz in Calistoga
KCMU-LP FM 103.3 MHz

Transportation

Major highways
 State Route 12
 State Route 29
 State Route 121
 State Route 128
 State Route 221

Interstate 80 travels briefly in Napa County.

Public transportation
Vine Transit operates local bus service in Napa, along with intercity routes that serve along State Route 29 between Vallejo (Solano County) and Calistoga, and State Route 12/I-80 to Fairfield and Suisun City, along with an Express route to El Cerrito Del Norte BART (WEEKDAYS ONLY) also another WEEKDAY ONLY Express route to Suisun City Amtrak. All routes within city of Napa only operate Monday to Saturday and regional routes operate everyday but all routes DO NOT operate on holidays.

Airports
 Napa County Airport is a general aviation airport south of the City of Napa.
 Angwin-Parrett Field is a public use airport east of Angwin and is owned by Pacific Union College.

Rail
The Napa Valley Railroad is owned by the Napa Valley Wine Train, a dining/excursion service. The Napa Wine train offers a variety of different experience packages some including: wine tasting including dinner, rides with Santa during Christmas time, special offers showcasing some of the valley's new releases. Customer will be seated in the 100 year old vintage train while they take a 36-mile round trip from Napa to St. Helena and back.

Events

Napa County hosts numerous cultural events throughout the year. The county fair takes place annually in early July at the Napa County Fairgrounds in Calistoga. The Napa Town and Country Fair takes place in mid-July at the Napa Valley Expo in Napa. In order to boost tourism during the normally slow winter months, area hotels, restaurants, tourist-based businesses partnered with the County's local arts agency Arts Council Napa Valley and visitor management bureau Visit Napa Valley to develop Arts in April], a program celebrating the diverse cultural offerings featured in wine and hospitality institutions, beginning in 2011. In March every year since the late '70s, the county plays host to the Napa Valley Marathon.

In June, the annual Napa Valley Wine Auction takes place. Wineries throughout the valley donate wines and other prizes to be auctioned off to the highest bidder. This annual event raises several million dollars per year, benefiting charities throughout Napa County.

Festival Napa Valley
In 2006, Napa Valley became home to the Festival Napa Valley, an annual food, wine, art, and music festival held at various venues throughout the valley. Additional music festivals, including Music in the Vineyards, Live in the Vineyard, the Robert Mondavi Summer Concert Series, all taking place annually in locations throughout the valley.

Napa Valley Film Festival
The Napa Valley Film Festival was founded in 2011 to recognize independent filmmaking of different genres. The festival occurs in November at various venues.

BottleRock Napa Valley
BottleRock Napa Valley is a music festival that took place for the first time in May 2013 on the grounds of the Napa Valley Exposition in Napa. The five-day festival featured over 60 bands and participation by over 300 wineries. Although deemed an artistic success, the organizers of the 2013 event left many unpaid creditors. A three-day event was held the following year and featured 45 musical acts.

A year-round arts and cultural resource for the county, Napa Valley Now, is presented by Arts Council Napa Valley. It is free for the public to use and contribute to and features all major happenings throughout the Valley.

Communities

Cities
American Canyon
Calistoga
Napa (county seat)
St. Helena
Yountville

Census-designated places
 Angwin
 Deer Park
 Moskowite Corner
 Oakville
 Rutherford
 Silverado Resort

Other unincorporated communities

 Aetna Springs
 Berryessa Highlands
 Capell Valley
 Chiles Valley
 Circle Oaks
 Dry Creek
 Gordon Valley
 Lokoya
 Los Carneros
 Mt. Veeder
 Pope Valley
 Soda Canyon
 Spanish Flat
 Vichy Springs

Population ranking
The population ranking of the following table is based on the 2010 census of Napa County.

† county seat

In popular culture
Bottle Shock (2008) is based on the true story of the famous 1976 "Judgment of Paris," an important event in the history of Napa Valley winemaking.
The setting for the 1995 movie A Walk in the Clouds is Napa Valley in 1945.
In the 1998 remake of The Parent Trap, the girls' father was portrayed as a Napa Valley winemaker.
The Napa Valley Film Commission lists other films with a setting in Napa or with film shot in Napa County.

Notable residents
Michael Chiarello, chef
Francis Ford Coppola, director
Margaret Keane, artist
Thomas Keller, chef
Robert Mondavi, winemaker
Gustave Niebaum, winemaker
Warren Winiarski, winemaker and grape grower
Robin Williams, actor

See also

Pacific Union College
Eriophyllum latilobum
Lasthenia conjugens
List of school districts in California by county
Napa County Airport
National Register of Historic Places listings in Napa County, California

Notes

References

External links

 
 
 Flags of Napa County
 Napa Now history
 Convention & Visitors Bureau

 
California counties
Counties in the San Francisco Bay Area
 
1850 establishments in California
Populated places established in 1850
Majority-minority counties in California